Lim Yoo-jin, better known by her stage name Neon Bunny, is a South Korean singer-songwriter. At the ninth annual Korean Music Awards in 2012, she won Best Pop Album for Seoulight.

Life and career 
Prior to her solo debut, Neon Bunny was a session keyboard player for the South Korean indie rock group The Black Skirts. She debuted in 2011 with the album Seoulight. After making her debut, she released an EP entitled Happy Ending in 2012 as a follow-up to Seoulight.

In 2014, Neon Bunny released the single "It's You." In 2015, she released "Romance in Seoul," which was ranked at number 8 on Noiseys "Top 20 K-pop Songs of 2015" list. In 2016, she released "Forest of Skyscrapers," the video of which was inspired by Wong Kar-wai's films and Japanese animation like Akira.

On July 13, 2016, she released the second album, Stay Gold, which includes "It's You," "Romance in Seoul," and "Forest of Skyscrapers." It was named by Bandcamp as one of the best Korean electro-pop releases of 2016.

On November 25, 2017, she released the single "Now." The single was written, arranged and produced by Neon Bunny, and mixed and mastered by Cliff Lin.

Discography 
Albums
 Seoulight (2011)
 Stay Gold (2016)
 Kosmos (2021)

EPs
 Happy Ending (2012)

Singles
 "It's You" (2014)
 "Romance in Seoul" (2015)
 "Forest of Skyscrapers" (2016)
 "Now" (2017)
 "Tell Me" (2018)
 "Girl" (2019)

Compilations
 "Lost in Love" from My Secret Hotel OST Part 2 (2014)

Guest appearances
 Demicat – "Singing Bird" from Out Loud (2013)
 Smells – "Listen to Your Heart" from Up and Down (2013)
 Spazzkid – "Daytime Disco" (2014)
 Demicat – "Light" from Oredorok (2017)
 Night Tempo – "Overture" from Moonrise (2018)
 Swimrabbit – "Azilangi" (2018)

Awards and nominations

References

External links 
 
 

1983 births
Living people
South Korean singer-songwriters
21st-century South Korean singers
21st-century South Korean women singers
South Korean women singer-songwriters